The Tides was an Indie rock band best known as the predecessor to Northern Irish band General Fiasco. The band was formed in 2002 by Paul McMillan on vocals/guitar and Paul Quinn on drums. Owen Strathern joined the group as bass player in 2004. Later the band included a live guitarist Stephen Leacock, who went on to play drums in General Fiasco with Owen Strathern. The group disbanded in 2007 due to work commitments and General Fiasco becoming more serious.

History
The Tides formed in 2002. The 4 members went to the same school (Rainey) in Magherafelt in Northern Ireland.  In 2004, The Tides ep was recorded at Manor Park studios with Neal Caulderwood. In 2005, this was followed up with the 'On Our Way' ep. In 2006, they entered BBC's ATL Rock School and won. The band featured on the TV show alongside Emma Willis as one of the judges. Following this, the band recorded new songs at the famous Windmill Lane studio in Dublin and a studio in Belfast. In late 2006, these songs along with some tracks from the previous 2 ep's was released as the album 'One For The Man Over There'. The album received critical acclaim by the music press including Hotpress, Daily Mirror and BBC ATL saying 'if Oasis could write the likes of All Good for Me, there would be a day of national celebration'.

The band would play regularly in Magherafelt's rock bar Bryson's as well as other venues throughout Northern Ireland. IMRO showcases in Dublin and the Y Not Festival were played at in the UK & Ireland as the band were featured on BBC's ATL tv shows, BBC Radio 1, RTE 2FM and other regional radio stations.

They also supported the likes of Kaiser Chiefs, The Raconteurs, Starsailor, The View, ASIWYFA, Duke Special. Towards the last months of the band, as the album was released, Strathern drifted away from the music style and focussed on General Fiasco. The album was released in small numbers throughout HMV in Northern Ireland and was not widely available. As of 2020, the album is now available online for the first time. Streaming services such as Spotify and Apple Music have the album available.

Owen still plays in General Fiasco and hosts the open mic night every Monday in Filthy McNasty's bar in Belfast.

Paul McMillan (Pepe) owns wedding band 'Exclusive' playing throughout Ireland.

Paul Quinn now lives in Australia.

Band members
Paul McMillan - Vocals and guitar
Owen Strathern - Bass and vocals
Paul Quinn - Drums

Live musicians
Stephen Leacock - Guitar and vocals

Discography

Studio albums
 One for the Man Over There - 2007

EPs
 The Tides - 2004
 On Our Way - 2005

Musical groups from County Londonderry
British blues rock musical groups
Indie rock groups from Northern Ireland
British musical trios